Spilarctia yukikoae is a moth in the family Erebidae. It was described by Yasunori Kishida in 1995. It is found in Nepal.

References

Y
Moths of Asia
Endemic fauna of Nepal
Lepidoptera of Nepal
Moths described in 1995